The 1982 season was the Cincinnati Bengals' 13th season in the National Football League, their 15th overall and their third under head coach Forrest Gregg.  It was the first year in which the Bengals made the playoffs for a second-consecutive season, and they would not do so again for another 30 years.

The Bengals posted a 7–2 record in a strike-shortened season to earn a postseason berth but lost to the Jets in the first round of the playoffs, 44–17. This was the only playoff loss by the Bengals at Riverfront Stadium. Ken Anderson led the AFC in passing for the fourth time as the Bengals boasted the second-best offense in the NFL. Perhaps the best moment of the season for the Bengals was defeating the Raiders 31–17. The loss by the Raiders was their only loss of the season. The Bengals went 4–0 at home in 1982.

The last remaining active member of the 1982 Cincinnati Bengals was tight end Rodney Holman, who retired after the 1995 season.

Offseason

NFL Draft

Personnel

Staff

Roster

Regular season

Schedule 

Note: Intra-division opponents are in bold text.

Standings

Playoffs

References

External links 
 1982 Cincinnati Bengals at Pro-Football-Reference.com

Cincinnati Bengals
Cincinnati Bengals seasons
Cinc